Raccoon River Valley Trail (RRVT) is a rail trail running  from Waukee, Iowa, to Jefferson, Iowa. The  portion of the trail from Waukee to Herndon is part of the American Discovery Trail, which runs between Cape Henlopen State Park in Delaware and Point Reyes near the Bay Area of California. In Iowa, the American Discovery Trail will be concurrent with U.S. Bicycle Route 50 (see United States Numbered Bicycle Routes).

The recreational trail runs through the counties of Polk, Dallas, Guthrie, and Greene in Iowa. It is a paved trail, mainly asphalt, though three sections are concrete. One concrete section extends from Jefferson south for four miles (6 km). Another concrete section is a twelve-mile (20 km) section connecting Linden, Panora, and Yale.  Constructed during 2010-2013, the  North Loop, which runs between Dawson and Waukee through Perry, Minburn, and Dallas Center, is the third concrete section.

In downtown Perry on Saturday, June 1, 2013, the grand opening of the new 33 mile "north loop" included food and beverage vendors; a bicycle poker run from 9:00 until 12:30 with cards at Waukee, Dallas Center, Minburn, Forest Park Museum, Perry, the bicycle bridge over the North Raccoon River west of Perry, Dawson, and Jamaica.  See the "north loop" Grand Opening flyer for more.

The north loop between Herndon and Waukee, is wider, nearly flat, and is much more exposed to the sun and wind.

By 2007, the conservation board directors estimated that more than 125,000 people use this trail each year. In 2014, the Dallas County Conservation Department estimated over 330,000 trail users of the RRVT annually.

Locations of trailheads
Original RRVT

 Waukee
 Waukee - junction with North Loop
 Ortonville
 Adel
 Redfield
 Linden
 Panora
 Yale
 Herndon - junction with North Loop
 Cooper
 Jefferson

North Loop RRVT

 Herndon - junction with Original Trail 
 Jamaica
 Dawson
 Perry
 Minburn
 Dallas Center
 Waukee - junction with Original Trail

History
Original RRVT

The RRVT trail between Waukee and Yale runs along the rail line established in 1881 as a narrow-gauge line of the Des Moines Western Railroad, which became part of the Wabash Railroad.  About 10 years later, the Milwaukee Road took over the line and converted it to standard gauge.  Passenger service ended along the line in 1952.  Freight service continued along the line until 1987.  In 1982, the Chicago & North Western purchased the line.  In 1987, the Central Iowa Energy Cooperative (CIECO), an affiliate of the Central Iowa Power Company, purchased the line and hundreds of acres of land located south of Panora, Iowa.  CIECO intended to build a coal-fired power plant on the land it had acquired south of Panora, near the railroad line.  However, plans for this power plant were abandoned.  Much of the land that was to have been the site of the power plant was placed in the  Lennon Mill Wildlife Area south of Panora.  In late 1987, CIECO, Iowa Trails, and the Conservation Boards of Dallas and Guthrie Counties agreed to develop the railroad line as a recreational trail.

On October 7, 1989, the first section of the Raccoon River Valley Trail opened.  In 1990,  of this paved trail were opened between Waukee, and Yale.  North of Yale, the RRVT lies along an old Union Pacific Railroad line which was abandoned in the late 1990s.  In 1997, the trail was extended with a paved trail from Yale to Jefferson. In 1999, the trail was extended with a  paved trail link from Waukee to the  Clive Greenbelt Trail in Clive.

North Loop

The  North Loop is an additional paved branch from Herndon through Perry to Waukee.  This paved branch follows the old Union Pacific Railroad line which was abandoned in late 2005.  From Herndon, it travels through Jamaica and then northern Dallas County to Dawson, Perry, Minburn, Dallas Center, and then to Waukee.    On May 14, 2011, the six mile (10 km) concrete segment from Dawson to Perry opened for use. A six-mile (10 km) concrete segment from Waukee to Dallas Center opened for use on October 15, 2011  On December 15, 2012, the section from Perry through Minburn to Dallas Center was completed.

The remaining sections of the North Loop were completed during early 2013 and opened for use on June 1, 2013.

In downtown Perry at noon on Saturday, June 1, 2013, the grand opening of the new 33 mile "north loop" occurred with Chuck Offenburger as Master of Ceremonies and a keynote speech by Kevin Cooney.

Connections to other trails
 east of Waukee in Polk County, the RRVT connects to the  Clive Greenbelt Trail in Clive and forms part of the Central Iowa Trails network.

Future connections to other trails
A connection is planned at Herndon to the  Krushchev in Iowa Trail in northern Guthrie County.  This link will give Coon Rapids, Bayard, and Bagley a paved trail connected to the RRVT.

Another future  connector will link the RRVT at Perry to Woodward and the  High Trestle Trail which is in northern Polk and Dallas counties and southern Boone and Story counties. In the middle of April 2016, the Dallas County Supervisors approved the connecting route between the two trails. The connector will depart Perry along Park Avenue. Then, it will be generally alongside 130th Street in Dallas County travelling through Bouton to Woodward utilizing both the existing railroad bed and road shoulders. From US 169 to Bouton, the trail will be near the  128th Place in Dallas County which is a crushed limestone road lying just north of Beaver Creek. The $5 million connector is expected to be completed by 2022. In March 2020, construction began from the Woodward end of the connector.

Connections to state parks
Connecting Big Creek State Park north of Polk City in Polk County, Ledges State Park south of Boone in Boone County, and Springbrook State Park west of Yale in Guthrie County, the  Central Iowa Bike Route is a picturesque circuit ride among the valleys of the Des Moines and Raccoon rivers and involves some "challenging" hills and the Raccoon River Valley Trail. Camping is available at both Ledges State Park and Springbrook State Park.

Winter Activities

Beginning in February, 2009, when at least 4 inches (10 cm) of snow covers the paved trail, the Raccoon Valley Snow Chasers (RVSC) groom the paved trail.  The RRVT between Jefferson and Waukee along with the North Loop is part of a larger winter activities trail network of over 200 miles (320 km).  During the winter, this groomed trail is ideal for both cross country skiers and snowmobilers.

Raccoon Valley Snow Chasers (RVSC)
Search social media pages for "Raccoon Valley Snow Chasers" to get current information for snowmachines on the Raccoon River Valley Trail.  Created July 28, 2010, the RVSC social media page contains a timeline of past events.

Raccoon Valley Snow Chasers (RVSC):

Monthly meetings, usually on the 2nd Thursday at the Lake Panorama Conference Center near Panora
Summer campouts, often in July at Springbrook State Park near Yale
Summer outings, often in August, at the main beach, also known as boulder beach, on the east side of Lake Panorama near Panora
Fall grass drags, often on the 2nd or 3rd Sunday in November or the 1st Sunday in December, at the Flack river farm five miles west of Jefferson—just south of Highway 30 and just west of county road P14
Winter ice drags, often the 2nd Sunday in February, at the main beach, also known as boulder beach, on the east side of Lake Panorama near Panora
Winter rides, sometimes in other nearby states: near Cable, Wisconsin at Lake Namekagon during the 2nd week of February in 2014
DNR-certified Iowa snowmobile safety classes for youths ages 11 to 18, often the 2nd Saturday in December, at the Lake Panorama Association (LPA) Conference Center near Panora

In 2011, RVSC received the ISSA "CLUB OF THE YEAR" award.

See also
List of rail trails
Clive Greenbelt Trail
High Trestle Trail
Krushchev in Iowa Trail

References

External links
"north loop" Grand Opening flyer
United States Bicycle Route System (USBR): National Corridor Plan - see USBR 50
American Discovery Trail
 Raccoon River Valley Trail - Iowa Natural Heritage Foundation (INHF) website
Raccoon River Valley Trail - Chuck Offenburger's website
RRVT - Mobile apps website
Trail Map with trailheads
Interactive Trail Map
Central Iowa Trail System
Central Iowa Trails Map
Central Iowa Trails Network - overview from INHF
Clive Greenbelt Trail INHF website
Clive Greenbelt Trail City of Clive website
High Trestle Trail INHF website
Krushchev in Iowa Trail
Bike Iowa
Raccoon Valley Snow Chasers (RVSC).  Search "Raccoon Valley Snow Chasers" on social media pages for current information.
Raccoon Valley Snow Chasers Snowmobile Trail Map 2010

Rail trails in Iowa
American Discovery Trail
Protected areas of Polk County, Iowa
Protected areas of Dallas County, Iowa
Protected areas of Guthrie County, Iowa
Protected areas of Greene County, Iowa
National Recreation Trails in Iowa